Montmorenci is an unincorporated community in Aiken County, South Carolina, United States. Montmorenci has a post office with ZIP code 29839.

See also
Happyville, South Carolina

References

Unincorporated communities in Aiken County, South Carolina
Unincorporated communities in South Carolina